Mikušovce may refer to:

 Mikušovce in Ilava District
 Mikušovce in Lučenec District